The Casey County Courthouse, on Courthouse Square in Liberty, Kentucky was built in 1888.  It was listed on the National Register of Historic Places in 1977.

It was designed by the McDonald Brothers architects of Louisville, Kentucky.

References

Courthouses on the National Register of Historic Places in Kentucky
Romanesque Revival architecture in Kentucky
Government buildings completed in 1888
National Register of Historic Places in Casey County, Kentucky
County courthouses in Kentucky
1888 establishments in Kentucky
Individually listed contributing properties to historic districts on the National Register in Kentucky